NRL 360 is an Australian nightly NRL talk show that deals with the issues in the NRL. It began airing on Fox Sports on 6 March 2013.

Hosts
 Ben Ikin (2013–21)
 Paul Kent
 Yvonne Sampson (2021)
 Braith Anasta (2022- )

2015 Series
From Tuesday, 3 March 2015, NRL 360 moves from once a week on Wednesdays (30 episodes a season) to three nights a week (Tuesdays, Wednesdays & Thursdays) for a total of 90 episodes in 2015.

2016 Series
In 2016, for the finals series, in addition to the regular Tuesday-Thursday broadcast, they decided to broadcast on a fourth night  with Monday nights as the fourth with two journalists as well as Greg Alexander joining Ikin and Kent.

The final episode of 2016, the Thursday before the grand final and the day of the NRL fan day, they held a special live from the Sydney Opera House edition where they spoke to grand final captains, Paul Gallen and Cameron Smith, the grand final coaches Shane Flanagan and Craig Bellamy as well as the regular Thursday 'legends' Geoff Toovey and Billy Moore.

The 2016 NRL 360 schedule is as follows: (All 'nights' occur from the start of round 1 to the Grand final week except for Mondays which is only aired in the finals weeks)

 Mondays - (Finals Only) Journalists Night with Andrew Webster and Paul Crawely as well as  Greg Alexander. 
 Tuesdays - Players Night with  Benji Marshall &  Michael Ennis - (Current Players)
 Wednesdays - Coaches night with  Laurie Daley &  Kevin Walters - (Current State of Origin Coaches)
 Thursdays - Legends night with  Geoff Toovey &  Billy Moore - (Past Players)

2017 Series
The 2017 edition of NRL360 is one of many shows on the new Fox League channel. NRL 360 is now hosted on Mondays, Tuesdays and Wednesdays.

 Mondays - Coaches night with  Laurie Daley & Kevin Walters  - (Current State of Origin Coaches) + Phill Rothfield
 Tuesdays - Players Night with  James Graham & Aaron Woods  - (Current Players) + Andrew Webster
 Wednesdays - Legends night   Billy Moore with  Danny Buderus  - (Past Players) + Paul Crawely.

Whilst both the Coaches remain the same, with the retirement of Michael Ennis and the move to the Brisbane Broncos by Benji Marshall Canterbury-Bankstown and Wests Tigers captains James Graham and Aaron Woods respectively take their places.  Furthermore, since the signing of Geoff Toovey by the Bradford Bulls in the English Championship, former Newcastle Knights legend and coach Danny Buderus comes in.

NRL 360 Summer Series
At the conclusion of the 2017 NRL season, it was announced that a grand final edition would be aired the Monday after the grand final. It was later revealed that a 'Summer Series' would air at 7:30 pm (19:30) on Monday nights until the end if the 2017 Rugby League World Cup.

 Mondays - Ben Ikin and Paul Kent joined by Phill Rothfield and Paul Crawley.

2018 Series
It was announced that the series would begin earlier normally to provide off-season news and opinion starting on Monday 29 January.  
The regular series began a week prior to the first round under the following program.

 Mondays - Phil Rothfield joins Ben and Paul + Coaches night with rotating coaches including current and former NRL, Origin and International coaches.
 Tuesdays - Paul Crawley joins Ben and Paul + Players Night with  Luke Lewis & Josh Reynolds  - (Current Players) 
 Wednesdays - James Hooper joins Ben and Paul + legends night with  Billy Moore and a ‘rotating legend’ including Danny Buderus , Greg Alexander , Nathan Hindmarsh  or Steve Roach .

2019 Series
It was announced mid-season that the series would shift to the 7:30 p.m. AEST time-slot, an hour later than in previous years.

Mondays - Phil Rothfield joins Ben and Paul + Coaches night with rotating coaches including current and former NRL, Origin and International coaches.
Tuesdays - Paul Crawley joins Ben and Paul + Players Night with  James Graham & Benji Marshall  - (Current Players)
Wednesdays - James Hooper joins Ben and Paul + legends night with  Billy Moore and a ‘rotating legend’ including Danny Buderus , Mark Carroll ,  Michael Ennis  or Luke Lewis .

2020 Series
With James Graham's move to Super League club St Helens mid-season, it was announced Damien Cook would take his place on Players Night.
Mondays - Phil Rothfield and James Hooper join Ben and Paul.
Tuesdays - Paul Crawley and Brent Read join Ben and Paul + Players Night with  Damien Cook (previously  James Graham) & Benji Marshall  - (Current Players)
Wednesdays - James Hooper and Lara Pitt join Ben and Paul + legends night with two legends out of   Billy Moore, Mark Carroll , Greg Alexander , and Geoff Toovey , before  Laurie Daley from the Big Sports Breakfast joins Ben and Paul.

2021 Series 
It was announced during Magic Round that Ray Hadley from 2GB would appear on the show. This series also marked the departure of Ben Ikin as co-host, after it was announced mid-season he would be the new Head of Football at the Brisbane Broncos.
Mondays - Phil Rothfield and James Hooper join Ben and Paul.
Tuesdays - Paul Crawley and Ray Hadley (previously Brent Read) join Ben and Paul + Players Night with   James Graham & Benji Marshall  
Wednesdays - James Hooper and Lara Pitt join Ben and Paul + Legends Night with two legends out of   Billy Moore, Mark Carroll , Greg Alexander , and Geoff Toovey , before  Laurie Daley from the Big Sports Breakfast joins Ben and Paul.

2022 Series 
It was announced that Braith Anasta would fill in for Yvonne as co-host while she was on maternity leave.
Mondays - Phil Rothfield and James Hooper join Braith and Paul.
Tuesdays - Paul Crawley and David Riccio join Braith and Paul + Players Night with former players James Graham  & Benji Marshall  
Wednesdays - Phil Rothfield and Brent Read join Braith and Paul + Legends Night with two legends out of   Billy Moore, Mark Carroll , Benny Elias , Steve Roach , and Geoff Toovey , before  Laurie Daley from the TAB joins Braith and Paul.

See also

 List of Australian television series
 List of longest-running Australian television series

References

External links 

Fox Sports (Australian TV network) original programming
Australian sports television series
2013 Australian television series debuts
Rugby league television shows
English-language television shows